Edgar Chacón (30 March 1945 – 13 August 2005) was a Guatemalan footballer. He competed in the men's tournament at the 1968 Summer Olympics.

References

External links
 

1945 births
2005 deaths
Guatemalan footballers
Guatemala international footballers
Olympic footballers of Guatemala
Footballers at the 1968 Summer Olympics
Sportspeople from Guatemala City
C.S.D. Municipal players
Association football forwards